Pletch is a surname. Notable people with the surname include:

Dan Pletch (born 1983), Canadian rugby union player, identical twin of Mike
Mike Pletch (born 1983), Canadian rugby union player

See also
Petch
Pletsch